Brian Snoddy is an artist whose work has appeared in role-playing games.

Career
Brian Snoddy and his friend Matt Wilson formed Privateer Press with writer Matt Staroscik to publish their own d20 supplements. Snoddy and Wilson produced the covers and interior art for Privateer's first adventures published in 2001.

Brian Snoddy was the penciller for the Classic Star Wars: The Early Adventures comics as well as one of the illustrators for the Knights of the Old Republic Campaign Guide. His Dungeons & Dragons work includes books such as Deities & Demigods, Libris Mortis, and Magic of Faerûn.

Snoddy is credited with inking some of the early Girl Genius comics. Snoddy is also known for his work on the Magic: The Gathering collectible card game.

References

External links
 
 

Living people
Role-playing game artists
Year of birth missing (living people)